The Maryland Historical Trust serves as the central historic preservation office in Maryland. The properties listed reside within the boundaries of modern Howard County. Prior to 1851, sites would have been part of Anne Arundel County. Sites settled prior to 1650 would have been part of St Mary's County in the Province of Maryland which was settled in 1632 by Europeans.

Maryland Historical Trust properties in Howard County

HO-1, Cherry Grove, 2937 Jennings Chapel Road, Woodbine
HO-2, Oakdale, 16449 Edwin Warfield Road, Woodbine
HO-3, Pleasant Valley (Lost by Neglect), 13893 Forsythe Road, Cooksville
HO-4, Red House Tavern, Hoods Mill Road (MD 97), Cooksville
HO-5, Roberts Inn, 14610 Frederick Road (MD 144), Cooksville
HO-6, Ellerslie, 2761 Roxbury Mills Road (MD 97), Cooksville
HO-7, Union Chapel (St. Andrew's Episcopal Church), Roxbury Mills Road (MD 97), Glenwood
HO-8, Longwood (The Dependency), 3188 Roxbury Mills Road (MD 97), Glenwood
HO-9, Round About Hills (Peacefields), 15505 Cattail Oaks, Glenwood
HO-10, Villa de Speranza (New Year's Gift), 3890 Roxbury Mills Road (MD 97), Glenwood
HO-11, Duvall's Range (Stephen Boone Dorsey House), 15451 Roxbury Road, Glenwood
HO-12, Roxbury Mill, Roxbury Mill Road, Brookeville
HO-13, Howard Lodge (Taylor's Park), 12301 Howard Lodge Drive, Sykesville
HO-14, Howard County Hunt Club, 13402 Triadelphia Road, Ellicott City
HO-15, Glenelg Manor (Glenelg Country School), 12793 Folly Quarter Road, Glenelg
HO-16, Folly Quarter Manor (McTavish House, Carrollton Hall), 12290 Folly Quarter Road, Ellicott City
HO-17, Folly Quarter Farm (and Bath House), 4308 Folly Quarter Road, Ellicott City
HO-18, Walnut Grove, 5192 Sheppard Lane, Clarksville
HO-19, Huntington Farms, 13180 Brighton Dam Road, Clarksville
HO-20, Hickory Ridge, 13032 Highland Road, Clarksville

HO-21, Waverley, 2335 Waverly Mansion Drive, Marriotsville
HO-22, Doughoregan Manor (Charles Carroll III of Carrollton House), 3500 Old Manor Lane, Ellicott City 
HO-23, Burleigh Manor and Gate House (Burleigh Cottage), 3950 White Rose Way, Ellicott City
HO-24, Font Hill, 3838 Parrot Drive, Ellicott City
HO-25, Brick House on the Pike (Brick House Farm, Ellerslie), 9564 National Pike (US 40), Ellicott City
HO-26, St. John's Episcopal Church, 9130 Frederick Road (MD 144), Ellicott City 
HO-27, Daniels Mill (Elysville, Gary, Alberton Mill), Daniels Road, Ellicott 
HO-28, Dorsey Hall, 5100 Dorsey Hall Drive, Ellicott City
HO-29, Arlington (Fairway Hills Golf Club), 5100 Columbia Road, Columbia
HO-30, Woodlawn, Bendix Road (Formerly 9254 Old Annapolis Road, Columbia
HO-31, Spring Hill and Quarters, 4659 Montgomery Road (MD 103) Also 4614 New Cut Road, Ellicott City
HO-32, Oakland Manor, 5430 Vantage Point Road, Columbia Maryland
HO-33, Blandair, 6651 Little Patuxent Parkway (MD 175), Columbia
HO-34, Waveland, Sewells Orchard Drive, Columbia
HO-35, Christ Church (Queen Caroline Parish Church), 6800 Oakland Mills Road, Columbia 
HO-36, Oak Hall Site, Oak Hall Lane, Columbia 
HO-37, Athol, 6680 Columbia Pike (US 29), Columbia
HO-38, Montpelier, 10904 Johns Hopkins Road, Laurel
HO-39, Worthington's Quarters (White Hall, Iris Hall), Weather Worn Way, Columbia
HO-40, Moundland, Guilford Road, Columbia
HO-41, Commodore Joshua Barney House (Harry's Lott), 7912 Savage Guilford Road, Jessup
HO-42, Savage Mill Historic District, Savage
HO-43, Belmont (Moore's Morning Choice), 6555 Belmont Woods Road, Elkridge
HO-44, Troy Hill (Troy), Baltimore Washington Boulevard (US 1), Elkridge
HO-45, Trinity Church, 7474 Baltimore Washington Boulevard (US 1), Elkridge
HO-46, Spurriers Tavern, site, Waterloo Road (MD 175) & Baltimore Washington Boulebard (US 1), Jessup
HO-47, Temora, 4252 Columbia Road, Ellicott City
HO-48, Woodlawn (Le Papillon), 8880 Frederick Road, Ellicott City
HO-49, Mount Hebron, 2331 Calvin Circle, Ellicott City
HO-50, First Presbyterian Church (Howard County Historical Society Building), 8328 Court Avenue, Ellicott City

HO-51, Howard County Courthouse, 8360 Court Avenue, Ellicott City
HO-52, Patapsco National Bank, 8098 Main Street (MD 144), Ellicott City
HO-53, Samuel Powell House, 8198 Main Street (MD 144), Ellicott City
HO-54, Howard County Jail, 3709 Park Avenue (Formerly 1 Emory Street), Ellicott City
HO-55, Emory Methodist Church, 3799 Church Road, Ellicott City
HO-56, Jenkins-Powell House (Jonathan Ellicott House, MacGill House), 3791 Church Road, Ellicott City
HO-57, The Manse, 3788 Church Road, Ellicott City
HO-58, Angelo Castle (Angelo Cottage, Castle Angelo), 3749 Church Road, Ellicott City
HO-59, Mount Ida, 3691 Sarah's Lane, Ellicott City
HO-60, Patapsco Female Institute (Patapsco Heights Hotel), 3655 Church Road, Ellicott City

HO-61, The Firehouse Museum (Old Howard Co. Fire Department Building, Old Howard Co. Public Library), 3829 Church Road, Ellicott City
HO-62, The Town Hall (Opera House, Rhodey's Emporium), 8044-8046 Main Street (MD 144), Ellicott City
HO-63, Patterson Viaduct, Ilchester Road & River Road, Catonsville
HO-64, Thomas Isaac's Log Cabin (Stanton's Log Cabin), Main Street (MD 144) & Ellicott Mills Drive, Ellicott City
HO-65, Ellicott Family Burial Grounds, Old Columbia Pike (MD 987), Ellicott City 
HO-66, Quaker Burial Grounds, Old Columbia Pike (MD 987), Ellicott City 
HO-67, Friends Meeting House (Quaker Meeting House), 3771 Old Columbia Pike (MD 987), Ellicott City
HO-68, Howard House, 8202 Main Street (MD 144), Ellicott City
HO-69, Walker-Chandler House (Ellicott Country Store), Mrs. Rowland Bounds' House, 8180 Main Street (MD 144), Ellicott City
HO-70, Patapsco Hotel (Thomas' Patapsco Hotel, Stewart's Hotel, Wilson Patapsco Hotel, Ellicott City Times), Ellicott City

HO-71, Ellicott City B&O Railroad Station, Freight Building, & Turntable, 2711 Maryland Avenue, Ellicott City
HO-72, Bridge Market (E.T. Clark Property, Radcliffe's Emporium, Louis T. Clark Grocery), 8000 Main Street (MD 144), Ellicott City
HO-73, Ellicott Mill Original Historic Site, Frederick Road (MD 144), Ellicott City
HO-74, BLANK
HO-75, BLANK 
HO-76, St. Paul's Catholic School (Patapsco National Bank), St. Paul Street, Ellicott City
HO-77, BLANK
HO-78, Ellicott City Historic District, Ellicott City
HO-79, I.O.O.F. Lodge Building (Annie's), 8126-8132 Main Street (MD 144), Ellicott City
HO-80, Thomas Viaduct, Baltimore & Ohio Railway, B&O Railroad over Patapsco River, Halethorpe

HO-81, Bollman Suspension Truss Bridge, Savage Road, Savage
HO-82,  Disney's Tavern (Mount Misery, Fabric House, Sprecher House), H.H. Tamburo Shop, 8298-8304 Main Street (MD 144), Ellicott City
HO-83, Collier's Grist Mill (Bernard Fort CM, Ellicott City Mills, E. C. Electric Light and Power Co.), 8069 Tiber Alley, Ellicott City
HO-84, Linden Grove (New Year's Gift), 5790 Tamar Drive, Columbia
HO-85, Montrose Farm, 13370 Brighton Dam Road, Clarksville 
HO-86, Railroad Hotel (TurnOver a NewLeaf, The Meeting House), 8028-8046 Main Street (MD 144), Ellicott City
HO-87, Bethesda (Dower Cottage, Long Reach), 9140 Sybert Drive, Ellicott City
HO-88, Cacao Lane Restaurant (Hunt's General Store, Millinery Shop, Edward Alexander House), 8066-8068 Main Street (MD 144), Ellicott City
HO-89, Bernard Campbell House (Froogle Fashions, Import Specialties), 8074-8082 Main Street (MD 144), Ellicott City
HO-90, Charlotte Tazewell House (Lena McCauley Brick House), 8192 Main Street (MD 144), Ellicott City

HO-91, Hobson's Choice, 2921 Florence Road, Woodbine
HO-92, Trusty Friend, Frederick Road (MD 144), Cooksville
HO-93, BLANK
HO-94, Samuel Powell House (Chateau Wine Supplies, Rhodey Beer Garden, Navicki's (Votta's) Shoe Repair), 8120 Main Street (MD 144), Ellicott City 
HO-95, Wheatfields (Chews Resolution Manor), 4588 Montgomery Road (MD 103), Ellicott City
HO-96, Elmonte (Twilford), Furrow Avenue, Ellicott City
HO-97, John Williams' House (Pairo & Pairo Law Offices), 8086 Main Street (MD 144), Ellicott City
HO-98, Lauman House (Alda Baptiste, Tongue Row Fabric Boutique), 8060 Main Street (MD 144), Ellicott City
HO-99, Margaret Smith Gallery (Norton's Drug Store), 8090 Main Street (MD 144), Ellicott City
HO-100, Bicentennial Headquarters Building, 8355 Court Avenue, Ellicott City
HO-101, St. Paul's Episcopal Church, Old Frederick Road, Mt. Airy 
HO-102, Sarah Jane Powell Log Cabin (Albert E. France Log Cabin), 2240 Roxbury Mills Road (MD 97), Cooksville
HO-103, Charles Layton, Jr. Log Building, site, 1221 St. Michaels Road, Woodbine
HO-104, Thaddeus Crapster's Log House, 3101 Cabin Run, Woodbine
HO-105, Ellicott House (Rockland Farm), 3500 Woodbine Road (MD 94), Woodbine
HO-106, Robert Hunter House, Annapolis Rock Road, Woodbine
HO-107, George G. Willson Log House, site, Annapolis Rock Road, Woodbine
HO-108, Hipsley's Mill Road Log Ruins, site, Hipsley Mill Road, Woodbine
HO-109, Ann B. Dunn's Log House, ruin, Daisy Road & Jennings Chapel Road, Woodbine
HO-110, Dr. John Hood Owings House, site & Jennings Cemetery, Jennings Chapel Road, Brookville
HO-111, Happy Retreat, 3100 McNeal Road, Woodbine 
HO-112, J.P. Tarenz Log House (Cherry Grove Slave Quarters), 2898 Duvall Road, Woodbine
HO-113, Bernard Warfield Farm (The Heritage, Bite the Skinner), 16539 A.E. Mullinix Road, Woodbine
HO-114, The Heritage Log Building, site, A.E. Mullinix Road, Woodbine
HO-115, Sunnyside (Albert G. Warfield, III House), Woodbine Road (MD 94), Woodbine
HO-116, Beldon Patrick Farmhouse (Maple Dell Farm), 1960 Daisy Road, Woodbine
HO-117, Dr. William J. Bryson House (Summer Hill Farm), Frederick Road (MD 144), Cooksville 
HO-118, Albert Schulze Post & Plank Building, site, 1685 St. Michaels Road, Woodbine
HO-119, Deep Meadow, 3173 Daisy Road, Woodbine
HO-120, By His Grace, 3710 Roxbury Mills Road (MD97), Glenwood
HO-121, Nancy Valle's Stone House, 4401 Roxbury Mills Road (MD97), Brookville
HO-122, Stephen B. Dorsey Farm Tenant House (Russell Maisel's Stone House), 15282 Roxbury Road, Glenelg
HO-123, Clark Family House (George Chase Brick House), 15081 Roxbury Road, Roxbury Mills
HO-124, St. Barnabas Episcopal Church, 13135 Forsythe Road, Sykesville
HO-125, Wavertree, 12961 Triadelphia Road, Ellicott City
HO-126, Marvin Howard Log Building, Dorsey Mill Road, Glenwood
HO-127, Linda Byrd Eareckson Stone-Log House, 601 River Road, Sykesville
HO-128, Judge John L. Clark House (Dr. & Mrs. T.S.Herbert House), Marriotsville Road, Marriotsville
HO-129, Alexander Hassan Stone Ruins, Old Frederick Road (MD99), Woodstock
HO-130, Doughoregan Manor Gate House, 3120 Manor Lane, Ellicott City
HO-131, Enniscorthy (Albert S. Hammond House), 3412 Folly Quarter Road, Ellicott City
HO-132, Franciscan Friars Novitiate, 12290 Folly Quarter Road, Ellicott City
HO-133, Doughoregan Manor Stone House, Old Manor Lane, Ellicott City
HO-134, William Johnson Estate House, 4411 Manor Lane, Ellicott City
HO-135, Jack Gebhard House (Porter's Tavern), 4955 Manor Lane, Ellicott City
HO-136, Joel Kline Farm Ruins, Clarksville Pike (MD 108), Ellicott City
HO-137, Hopkins-Brosenne' Stone House (Pine Orchard Hotel), 10281 Baltimore National Pike (US 40), Ellicott City
HO-138, Gerwig-Lintner House, site (Lintner Stone House), 10101 Frederick Road (MD 144), Ellicott City
HO-139, Shirley (Little Brick House Farm, Herman Feaga Brick House), 10212 Little Brick House Court, Ellicott City
HO-140, Gary Memorial Methodist Church, Daniels Road, Ellicott City

HO-141, The Lawn, 6036 Old Lawyers Hill Road, Elkridge
HO-142, Old St. Johns Rectory, 3508 W. Gate Drive, Ellicott City
HO-143, MacAlpine Slave Quarters (Diniz House), 3645 Mac Alpine Road, Ellicott City
HO-144, Wayside Inn (Search Enlarged, Bethesda), 4344 Columbia Road, Ellicott City
HO-145, Mt. Joy (Santa Fe), 5000 Executive Park Drive, Ellicott City
HO-146, Stempner House, 5777 Main Street, Elkridge
HO-147, Eklof House (Chews Vineyard), 494 New Cut Road, Ellicott City
HO-148, Frank Boggs House, 5306 Waterloo Road (MD 104), Ellicott City
HO-149, Clover Hill (John C. Roswell House), 6121 Rockburn Branch Park Road, Elkridge
HO-150, Alice L. Lorenz House, Elkridge
HO-151, Rockburn, 6581 Belmont Woods Road, Elkridge
HO-152, Hockley Grist Mill House (Dorsey Mill), 5481 Levering Avenue, Elkridge 
HO-153, Fairview (Warfield's Range, Gorman House), 10150 Gorman Road, Laurel
HO-154, Kelly Stone House (Coopers House at Oakland Mill), 5509 Old Columbia Road, Columbia
HO-155, Gales-Gaither Stone House, 5505 Old Columbia Road, Columbia
HO-156, Dalton, 9315 Mellenbrook Road, Columbia
HO-157, Alabama Farm, site, Trotter Road, Columbia
HO-158, River Hill Farm (Four Brothers Portion, Richard B.Owings House), Guilford Road, Clarksville
HO-159, Oakland Farms, 14175 Old Frederick Road, Cooksville
HO-160, Bassler House (HRD), Sunny Spring, Columbia
HO-161, John L. Due House (Henry Warfield House, Trotter House), 6044 Trotter Road, Clarksville
HO-162, Sturdevant Building, Clarksville Pike (MD 108), Clarksville
HO-163, Tierney Gambrel Roof House, site (Howard's Range), Guilford Road & Clarksville Pike (MD 108), Clarksville
HO-164, Clifton (Wellings Stone House, White Wine and Claret), 6420 Warm Sunshine Path, Clarksville
HO-165, Owings-Myerly House, site (Vogel House), 7538 Guilford Road (MD 32), Simpsonville
HO-166, St. Mark's Episcopal Church, 12700 Hall Shop Road, Highland
HO-167, Locust Grove (David Clarke Farmhouse), 1095 Hood's Mill Road (MD 97), Cooksville
HO-168, Banks Schoolhouse, 15491 Roxbury Mills Road (MD 97), Glenwood
HO-169, Roxbury Mill Miller's House, 4102 Roxbury Mill Road, Brookeville 
HO-170, Shipley's Adventure (Dr. Perilla House), 14830 Old Frederick Road, Clarksville
HO-171, Hedgerow (Left Out, Left Over, 13551 Triadelphia Mill Road, Clarksville 
HO-172, Adams Cottage, 5790 Ten Oaks Road, Clarksville
HO-173, Hood Family Cemetery (Ridgely Jones Property), Underwood Road, Sykesville
HO-174, Tubman House (Meadow Ridge Memorial Park House), 7250 Baltimore Washington Boulevard (US 1), Elkridge
HO-175, Judge William Matthew's House (Kingsdine), 2945 Roxbury Mills Road (MD 97), Glenwood
HO-176, Glenwood Country Club Building (Hepburn House), 2902 Roxbury Mills Road (MD 97), Glenwood
HO-177, Holly Rock Farm (J.B. Mathews House, Bloomsburg), 3060 Roxbury Mills Road (MD 97), Glenwood
HO-178, Schroll House, 8418 A Baltimore Washington Boulevard (US 1), Jessup
HO-179, Factory House (Percon Inc. Building),site, Old Scaggsville Road, Scaggsville
HO-180, Hobbs Regulation, 2555 McKendree Road, Glenwood
HO-181, R. Hook Log House (Hackett Log House), 14465 Frederick Road (MD 144), Cooksville
HO-182, Mrs. Miller Mills House (Francis Shipley House), 13523 Triadelphia Road, Ellicott City
HO-183, Day House and Store, 14040 Triadelphia Road, Glenelg
HO-184, Old Oakland Manor (Ralston House), 10026 Hyla Brook Road, Columbia
HO-185, Oakland Manor Blacksmith Shop (Ralston Stone Cottage), 10102 Hyla Brook Road, Columbia
HO-186, Clarkland Farm & Log Smokehouse (Charles R. Pue Farm/Hammond's Inheritance), 10380 Clarksville Pike (MD 108), Ellicott City
HO-187, Harmony Cemetery, McKendree Road, West Friendship 
HO-188, Granite Park, Murray Hill Drive, Columbia
HO-189, Humphrey Wolfe Farm (John Beane Farm), 3607 Roxbury Mills Road (MD 97), Glenwood
HO-190, Good Fellowship, 1795 Woodstock Road (MD 125), Woodstock
HO-191, Roland Maxwell Farmhouse (Carl R. Myers House), 1805 Marriottsville Road, Marriottsville 
HO-192, Friendship Pines, 13905 Frederick Road (MD 144), Cooksville
HO-193, Linwood (Linwood Children's Center), 3421 Martha Bush Drive, Ellicott City
HO-194, Welsh-Webb Farm, site (Trail House, Dale Mouser House, Wagon Trail Farm), 16180 Frederick Road (MD 144), Woodbine
HO-195, Fowble House, site, Frederick Road (MD 144), Lisbon
HO-196, Flohr House, site, Frederick Road (MD 144), Lisbon
HO-197, Cheaks Tavern, site (Stage Coach Inn, Charles Reck Home), Frederick Road (MD 144), Lisbon
HO-198, Cope-Knox Log House, site (M. E. Parsonage, Albert G. Warfield House), 16041 Frederick Road (MD 144), Lisbon
HO-199, Methodist Episcopal Parsonage (Flohr-Barnes House), site, 16037 Frederick Road (MD 144), Lisbon
HO-200, Alvin G. Leamon House (Thacker-Cogswell House), 16032 Frederick Road (MD 144), Lisbon
HO-201, Mathis House, 16024 Frederick Road (MD 144), Lisbon
HO-202, Mayne House (Owings Log-Brick House), 16020 Frederick Road (MD 144), Lisbon
HO-203, Emerson Pickett Log House, site, Frederick Road (MD 144), Lisbon
HO-204, Lisbon Presbyterian Manse (Lisbon M.P. Parsonage, McIntosh House), 16000 Frederick Road (MD 144), Lisbon
HO-205, Lee's Market and House, 16005 Frederick Road (MD 144), Lisbon
HO-206, Lisbon Hotel (Drovers Inn, Poole's Country Store & Post Office, Caleb Pancoast House site), Frederick Road (MD 144) & Madison Street, Lisbon
HO-207, Westwood M.E. Church, 13554 Triadelphia Road, Ellicott City
HO-208, Brown Chapel U.M. Church, Howard Road, Dayton
HO-209, Providence (Methodist) Church (Tatiana), 14290 Triadelphia Road, Glenwood 
HO-210, E. Walter Scott Farmhouse (Quail Hill Antiques), 6791 Guilford Road, Clarksville
HO-211, Dundee, 3775 Bonny Bridge Place, Ellicott City
HO-212, Dundee Smokehouse, Bonny Bridge Place, Ellicott City
HO-213, Savage Mill (Savage Industrial Center), Foundry Street & Washington Street, Savage
HO-214, Carroll Baldwin Memorial Hall (Savage Community Hall), 9035 Foundry Street, Savage
HO-215, 19th Century Mill Workers Houses, 9040-9062 Washington Street, Savage
HO-216, Old Mill Apartment House (Storch Apartment House #1), 9078 Washington Street, Savage
HO-217, Old Mill Workers Apartment House (Storch Apt. House), 9105-9111 Washington Street, Savage
HO-218, Savage-Irving House (Mansion House, Baldwin House), 9110 Washington Street, Savage
HO-219, Masonic Hall (Solomon's Lodge #121 A.F. & A.M.), 2-4 Washington Street, Savage
HO-220, Holte-Grafton House (Savage Mill Managers House), 8502 Fair Street, Savage
HO-221, Hutchinson-Hobbs House (Upper Baltimore St. Mill Houses), 9132-9136 Baltimore Street, Savage
HO-222, Gralton's Apartment House, 9105-9111 Baltimore Street, Savage
HO-223, Chickering House, 9066 Baltimore Street, Savage
HO-224, Minnie W. Rooney House, 9056-9058 Baltimore Street, Savage
HO-225, Mill Workers Houses (Storch Realty Duplexes), Savage
HO-226, Victor Myers Farmhouse, 9915 Gorman Road, Laurel
HO-227, Lewis Warfield House, 15948 Frederick Road (MD 144), Lisbon
HO-228, Dorsey-Hall House, site (Bidinger House), Frederick Road (MD 144), Lisbon
HO-229, Roy Martin House, site, Frederick Road (MD 144), Lisbon
HO-230, Lisbon Female School (Clark-Coursey House), 15928 Frederick Road (MD 144), Lisbon
HO-231, Paul Joggereit House, 15927 Frederick Road (MD 144), Lisbon
HO-232, Esworthy House, 15935 Frederick Road (MD 144), Lisbon
HO-233, The Misses Warfield House (Snyder's Piano & Organ, Inc.), 15947 Frederick Road (MD 144), Lisbon
HO-234, Zubovic Farmhouse, 1259 Ridge Road (MD 27), Mt. Airy 
HO-235, St. Stephens A.M.E. Church, 7741 Mayfield Avenue, Elkridge
HO-236, Overlook Farms (The Gould House), Murray Hill Road, Laurel
HO-237, Stansfield House, Gorman Road, Laurel
HO-238, Glenelg Gardeners Cottage, 12789 Folly Quarter Road, Glenelg
HO-239, The Herbiary (Rhinelander House), 12549 Folly Quarter Road, Ellicott City
HO-240, McKendree Methodist Church (Sharon Mission Baptist Church), McKendree Road, West Friendship
HO-241, Ellicott Family Burial Grounds, Old Frederick Road, Ellicott City 
HO-242, Joseph Ellicott House (Hollifield House, c. 1845), 8262 Old Frederick Road, Ellicott City
HO-243, The Oaks, 3251 Oaks Road, Ellicott City
HO-244, Lisbon Methodist Church, site, Frederick Road (MD 144) & Hopkins Alley, Lisbon
HO-245, Warner-Hawks House (Warner House), site, 16033 Frederick Road (MD 144), Lisbon
HO-246, Powers House, 16025 Frederick Road (MD 144), Lisbon
HO-247, Buckingham House (Edgar Smith Log & Frame House), 16021 Frederick Road (MD 144), Lisbon
HO-248, Harmony Church, 15996 North Avenue, Lisbon
HO-249, Ridgely-Mercier House (R.A. Poole House), 15921 Frederick Road (MD 144), Lisbon
HO-250, Howard Chapel U.M. Church (Howard Chapel M.E. Church), 1970 Long Corner Road, My. Airy
HO-251, Klein-Flynn House, 1614 Long Corner Road, Mt. Airy
HO-252, Warfield-Dougherty Store (Old Florence Store), 2600 Woodbine Road, Woodbine 
HO-253, Old Florence School, 3055 Florence Road, Woodbine
HO-254, Jennings Chapel U.M. Church, 2601 Jennings Chapel Road, Woodbine
HO-255, Warfield Family Cemetery, Jennings Chapel Road, Woodbine
HO-256, Albert Warfield Victorian House, 3300 Florence Road, Woodbine
HO-257, Albert Warfield Tenant House, 3370 Florence Road, Woodbine
HO-258, Daisy Trading Post and House, 15948 Union Chapel Road, Woodbine
HO-259, Daisy I.O.O.F. Building, site, 15949 Union Chapel Road, Woodbine
HO-260, Kimble's Cottage, 15698 Union Chapel Road, Woodbine
HO-261, Fulfillment (Milly's Delight), Union Chapel Road, Woodbine
HO-262, Myers Apartment Building, site (Inwood P.O. & General Store), Roxbury Mills Road (MD 97) & McKendree Road, Glenwood
HO-263, House of Silence (Ridgely's Reserve, Hakes Log House), 15780 Union Chapel Road, Woodbine
HO-264, Chippendale Farm (Justifiable), 14751 Addison Way, Woodbine
HO-265, Warfield's Range Log Cabin, site (Phelps Log Cabin), 10504 Patuxent Ridge Way, Laurel
HO-266, Warfield's Range (Phelphs Residence, Twin Cedars), 10504 Patuxent Ridge Way, Laurel
HO-267, Wildwood, Guilford Road, Columbia
HO-268, Hatfield Residence (Millers House), 6691 Cedar Lane, Columbia
HO-269, Charles Scaggs House, 10909 Johns Hopkins Road, Laurel
HO-270, Oak Grove Cemetery, Roxbury Mills Road (MD 97) & Union Chapel Road, Glenwood
HO-271, Oakhurst (Lardy House), 2460 McKendree Road, West Friendship 
HO-272, Warfield Cemetery, 14675 Carrs Mill Road, Glenwood
HO-273, Toomey House (Elkridge Furnace Tenant House), 5730 Furnace Road, Elkridge
HO-274, Hubert Black House (Larriland Farm), 2416 Woodbine Road (MD 94), Woodbine
HO-275, Daisy United Methodist Church, 2685 Daisy Road, Woodbine
HO-276, Mt. Gregory United Methodist Church, 2325 Roxbury Mills Road (MD 97), Cooksville
HO-277, St. Louis King Roman Catholic Church and Cemetery, 12500 Clarksville Pike (MD 108), Clarksville
HO-278, Tranquility (Peterson House), 4054 Jennings Chapel Road, Brookeville
HO-279, Harwood (Harlow House, Point Lookout Farm), 3676 Jennings Chapel Road, Woodbine
HO-280, Arthur Forsyth House (McCracken House), 14396 Old Frederick Road, Cooksville
HO-281, Wilderness Farm (Old Joshua Warfield Home), 3366 Jennings Chapel Road, Woodbine
HO-282, Limestone Valley Farm Stone Tenant House (Hayland Farm), Sheppard Lane, Clarksville
HO-283, Kefauver Boarding House, 8507 Old Frederick Road, Ellicott City
HO-284, Oak Lawn (Hayden House, former Board of Ed. Building), 8360 Court Place, Ellicott City
HO-285, Weir House (Second School Building, Planning Office), 8324 Court Avenue, Ellicott City
HO-286, Trollinger Cabin (No Documentation on File), Main Street, Ellicott City
HO-287, Cattail Farm (Reilly Farm), 4078 Roxbury Mills Road (MD 97), Glenwood
HO-288, Ruth Daggett House, 1276 Hoods Mill Road (MD 97), Cooksville
HO-289, Meriweather (Butler House), 14944 Roxbury Road, Glenelg
HO-290, St. Michaels Roman Catholic Church, St. Michael Road & Hardy Road, Mt Airy
HO-291, Oakley Farm (Celia Holland Home), 15802 Frederick Road (MD 144), Woodbine
HO-292, Joshua Disney Wheelwright Shop (Butterfield's), Clarksville Pike (MD 108), Highland
HO-293, King's Contrivance (Howard Research&DevelopmentCorp.), Shaker Drive, Columbia
HO-294, Wilson House at Roxbury Mill (Hilltop), 4152 Roxbury Mill Road, Brookeville 
HO-295, Woodcamp Farm (Hough House), 17403 Hardy Road, Mt. Airy 
HO-296, Earl Hough Farmhouse, 17520 Hardy Road, Mt. Airy
HO-297, Rose Hill (Alva Collins House), 979 Hood's Mill Road (MD 97), Cooksville
HO-298, St. Peters Rectory & Parish House, 8205 St. Paul Place, Ellicott City
HO-299, St. Peters Episcopal Church, site, St. Paul Place, Ellicott City
HO-300, Broxton, 3829 Old Columbia Pike (MD 987), Ellicott City
HO-301, Tuten's Cottage, site, 3825 Old Columbia Pike (MD 987), Ellicott City
HO-302, Charles Ringley's House, 3820 Old Columbia Pike (MD 987), Ellicott City
HO-303, Bruce Smyser's Double House, 3815 Old Columbia Pike (MD 987), Ellicott City
HO-304, Paul Perkins House, 3821 Old Columbia Pike (MD 987), Ellicott City
HO-305, Esther Rettger's Two-Part House, 3801-3803 Old Columbia Pike (MD 987), Ellicott City
HO-306, Friends Meeting House Historic Marker, Old Columbia Pike (MD 987), Ellicott City
HO-307, David Myer's House, 3786-3790 Old Columbia Pike (MD 987), Ellicott City
HO-308, Manelli Cottage, 3774 Old Columbia Pike (MD 987), Ellicott City
HO-309, Esther Rettger's Shop (Pieter Meerschaert's Shop), 3752-3754 Tongue Row, Ellicott City
HO-310, Rebel Trading Post & The Arms Room (Ijams Shop), 3744-3748 Tongue Row, Ellicott City
HO-311, R&R Unlimited Antiques, 3736-3742 Tongue Row, Elliott City
HO-312, Hi Ho Silver (Wexford House Shop), 3732 Tongue Row, Ellicott City
HO-313, George Anderson Shop, 3723 Tongue Row, Ellicott City
HO-314, Clarkland Farm Stone Tenant House, 10570 Clarksville Pike (MD 108), Columbia
HO-315, George Burgess House, 8448 Main Street, Ellicott City.
HO-316, Search Enclosed (The Chambers House), 4119 Old Columbia Pike (MD 987), Ellicott City
HO-317, Tilghman Grocery Store & House (Gloth Apartment House), 5733-5739 Main Street, Elkridge 
HO-318, Empty
HO-319, The Tilghman-Ferraro House, 5741-5745 Main Street, Elkridge
HO-320, Pocock-Rodgers House, 5749-5753 Main Street, Elkridge
HO-321, Gonzales House, 5761 Main Street, Elkridge
HO-322, Pfeiffer's Corner Blacksmith Shop House, 5961 Waterloo Road (MD 108), Ellicott City
HO-323, No Name, 8080 Main Street (MD 144), Ellicott City
HO-324, Mathews-E.T. Clark House, 8765 Ruppert Court, Ellicott City
HO-325, Caleb Merryman's Two Frame Buildings (Abend House, Kirkwood's Double House), 8329-8333 Main Street (MD 144), Ellicott City
HO-326, Bill Robbins & Carter Building, Ellicott City
HO-327, Kloman Building (James Earp Residence & Store), 5765 Main Street, Elkridge
HO-328, Kraft Cottage (Thompson House), 3896 Old Columbia Pike (MD 987), Ellicott City
HO-329, Howard Lodge #101 Masonic Building, 5814 Main Street, Elkridge
HO-330, Phoenix Emporium (George Goeller Building, P. Valmas Building), 8053 Main Street (MD 144), Ellicott City
HO-331, Oakland Manor Slave Quarters, 10102 Hyla Brook Road, Columbia
HO-332, Oliver Viaduct, Main Street (MD 144), Ellicott City
HO-333, Ellicott Cottage Lots 3 & 4 (Dennis Mulligan's Two Brick Houses), 3793 Mulligan Hill Lane, Ellicott City
HO-334, George White Shop, 8624 Main Street, Ellicott City
HO-335, Rorabaugh House, 10750 Guilford Road (MD 732), Annapolis Junction
HO-336, William Moore House, 8532-8534 Main Street, Ellicott City
HO-337, Asbury M. E. Church, Guilford Road (MD 732), Annapolis Junction
HO-338, Sam Caplan House (Burgess Tenant House, Miller's House), 8454 Main Street, Ellicott City
HO-339, Sam Caplan's Cottage, site, 8454 Main Street, Ellicott City
HO-340, Old Howard County Courthouse, 8398 Main Street, Ellicott City
HO-341, Talbott Lumber Company (Ellicott Mills Brewing Company), 8308 Main Street (MD144), Ellicott City
HO-342, William R. & Rebecca D. Dorsey House (Rock Hill), 3920 College Avenue, Ellicott City
HO-343, Curran-Bierly House (The History Shoppe), 8340 Main Street (MD144) (formerly 8398 Court Avenue), Ellicott City
HO-344, Conley House (Handwerk House, Eckert House, Sulivan House), 4919 Montgomery Road (MD103), Ellicott City
HO-345, The Vineyard (Devine House), 3611 Church Road, Ellicott City
HO-346, John Baker Five Houses, 3768-3776 St. Paul Street, Ellicott City
HO-347, St. Paul's Church Rectory, 3755 St. Paul Street, Ellicott City
HO-348, St. Paul's Roman Catholic Church, 3749 St. Paul Street, Ellicott City
HO-349, Guilford Quarry Pratt Through Truss Bridge & Ruins, B&O Railroad Spur over Little Patuxent River, Columbia
HO-350, Sam Caplan Double Houses, 3760-3766 St. Paul Street, Ellicott City
HO-351, Old St. Peter's Church Rectory, site,	St. Paul Place, Ellicott City
HO-352, Butke's Log House, site, 3816 New Cut Road, Ellicott City
HO-353, Lilburn Mansion (Balderstone's Mansion, Hazeldene), 3899 College Avenue, Ellicott City
HO-354, Lilburn Smokehouse, 3899 College Avenue, Ellicott City
HO-355, Lilburn Cottage, 3879 College Avenue, Ellicott City
HO-356, Simpson's Victorian Cottage, site (Porcher Cottage), 4080 College Avenue, Ellicott City
HO-357, Stillridge Herb Shop (Caplan's Stone Shop), 8129 Main Street (MD 144), Ellicott City
HO-358, Mumbles and Squeaks (Fissel's Stone Shop), 8133 Main Street (MD 144), Ellicott City
HO-359, Crosscurrents (Caplan's Frame Shop), 8113 Main Street (MD 144), Ellicott City
HO-360, Boone House (Stone Shop)	8081 Main Street (MD 144), Ellicott City
HO-361, Ida Holzweig's Double Stone House #1 (Brown Law Office), 8357 Main Street (MD 144), Ellicott City
HO-362, Ida Holzweig's Double Stone House #2 (State Farm & Antiques Etc.), 8345 Main Street (MD 144), Ellicott City
HO-363, Charles Ringly House #2	3817 Old Columbia Pike, Ellicott City
HO-364, Earlougher's Tavern (Essie Hammond House, Joseph & Ave Young House), 8777 Frederick Road (formerly 8777 Main Street), Ellicott City
HO-365, Old National Pike Milestones, Ellicott City
HO-366, Marshallee & Tenant House (Lyndwood, Markham), Marshalee Lane, Elkridge
HO-367, Elkridge Furnace Store House (Walker's Inheritance), Furnace Avenue & Race Road, Elkridge
HO-368, Boyle's Tavern (O'Malley Home)	5760 Main Street, Elkridge
HO-369, Pococks Store #1, 5721 Main Street, Elkridge
HO-370, Pococks Store #2, 5725 Main Street, Elkridge
HO-371, Kynes Store, 5762 Main Street, Elkridge
HO-372, Thomas Welling House, Old Frederick Road, Sykesville
HO-373, Fred Pipes House, Old Frederick Road, Sykesville
HO-374, Blaisdell House, Old Frederick Road, Sykesville
HO-375, Peddicord House (William Streaker House), 13370 Frederick Road (MD 144), Woodbine
HO-376, Star House on Turf Valley County Club, Turf Valley Road, Ellicott City	
HO-377, Main Street, Elkridge	Main Street, Elkridge
HO-378, Armagh (George Dobbin House, Libertini House), 6204 Lawyers Hill Road, Elkridge
HO-379, Badart Gardens & Barn (Latrobe Estate)	5519 Lawyers Hill Road, Elkridge	
HO-380, Dougherty House (Misses Dobbins House, Thomas Dobbins House)
HO-381, Elk Ridge Assembly Rooms	6090 Lawyers Hill Road, Elkridge
HO-382, Grace Episcopal Church	5805 Main Street, Elkridge
HO-383, Melville M. E. Church (Melville Chapel), Furnace Avenue, Elkridge
HO-384, Gaines A.M.E. Church, Montgomery Road (MD 103), Elkridge
HO-385, Boyle House, 5695 Main Street, Elkridge
HO-386, Rokeby (Morris House), 6393 Crossview Road, Elkridge
HO-387, Hockley (Chittick House, Fosters Fancy), 5925 River Road, Elkridge
HO-388, Cross Winds, 7255 Montgomery Road (MD 103), Elkridge
HO-389, Edward Stead House (The Gables, West View)	6235 Lawyers Hill Road, Elkridge
HO-390, Talbott's Last Shift (Roy Emory House)	5231 Talbots Landing Road, Ellicott City
HO-391, Olney	6781-6810 Norris Lane, Elkridge
HO-392, St. Mary's College & Chapel, site (Mount Clement, St. Clement's College), 4446 Bonnie Branch Road, Ellicott City
HO-393, Morning Choice (John Malkmus House), 6560 Belmont Woods Road, Elkridge
HO-394, White Hall 4130 Chatham Road, Ellicott City
HO-395, St. Clement's Episcopal Boys' School (Dr.Taylor House)	3876 Old Columbia Pike (MD 987), Ellicott City
HO-396, Woodley (Stephan House)	3925 St. John's Lane, Ellicott City
HO-397, St. John's Cemetery Lodge,	St. John's Lane, Ellicott City
HO-398, Bon Air Manor (Benson's Park)	4445 Stone Crest Drive, Ellicott City
HO-399, Bon Air Manor Gate House,4336 New Cut Road, Ellicott City
HO-400, MacAlpine, 3621 MacAlpine Road, Ellicott City
HO-401,  Squirrel Hill Farm (Mary & Stevenson White Farm, Mason House), 9725 Old Annapolis Road, Ellicott City
HO-402,  McKenzie's Discovery (Hannon House, No Less),	2416 McKenzie Road, Ellicott City
HO-403,  Meyer-Manner Log House (The Manner House), 10097 Century Drive, Ellicott City
HO-404, Hagen House (Omar Jones House), 4075 Old Columbia Pike (MD 987), Ellicott City
HO-405,  Pleasant Fields (Talbott's Last Shift, Cook Residence), 4007 Old Columbia Pike (MD 987), Ellicott City
HO-406, Mt. Pleasant, 10520 Old Frederick Road (MD 99), Woodstock
HO-407,  Invasion- (Dawn Acres), 13155 Frederick Road (MD 144), West Friendship
HO-408,  Sapling Range (McFann House), 14831 Triadelphia Road, Glenelg
HO-409,  Indian Caves (Shipley's Search), 1465 Underwood Road, Sykesville
HO-410, Ivy Hill ,1201 Driver Road, Marriottsville
HO-411, Woodlawn Slave Quarters Complex, Bendix Road, Columbia
HO-412, Gray Rock (Grey Rock), 3518 Angus Valley Trail, Ellicott City
HO-413,  Hickory, Florence Road, Woodbine
HO-414,  Pindell Store & House (Mathews-Pindell House),2960 Roxbury Mills Road (MD 97), Glenwood
HO-415,  The Lindens (Martielli House)	8514 Chapel View Road, Ellicott City
HO-416,  Quarry on the Cattail (Robert Warfield House)	Daisy Road, Woodbine
HO-417,  Frog Range, 15408 Frederick Road (MD 144), Woodbine
HO-418,  Annandale, 3274 Jones Road, Woodbine
HO-419,  Holly House Farm, 8105 Holly Manor Way, Fulton
HO-420,  Landing Road Cider Mill Works, site,	5012 Landing Road, Elkridge
HO-421,  Gray House, Klein-Linn house,	4754 Manor Lane, Columbia
HO-422,  Avoca, 4824 Montgomery Road (MD 103), Ellicott City
HO-423,  Dietrick Brick House Farm, 4649 Sheppard Lane, Ellicott City
HO-424,  Grimmet's Chance, 7010 Sanner Road, Clarksville
HO-425,  Windy Acres, 7389 Pindell School Road, Fulton
HO-426,  Springdale Farm, site (T. Guy Nichols Estate)	Brighton Dam Road, Highland
HO-427,  Worthington-Carr House, site	Kenton Court, Columbia
HO-428,  Trinity Chapel Sunday School Building	Old Montgomery Road, Oakland Mills
HO-429,  Trinity Church Rectory, 7474 Baltimore Washington Boulevard (US 1), Elkridge
HO-430,  Felicity II (Oakland Mills Blacksmith House and Shop)	5471 Old Columbia Road, Oakland Mills
HO-431,  Mt. Calvary Church (Glenwood Missionary Baptist Church)	3875 Roxbury Mills Road (MD 97), Roxbury
HO-432,  Guilford Methodist Church (Alberta G. Gary Memorial M.E. Church)	Guilford Road (MD 32), Columbia
HO-433,  Hazelhurst, Timberland Circle, Ellicott City
HO-434,  Sandstone Farm (The Cissel House, Hammond and Gist), 6927 Mink Hollow Road, Highland
HO-435,  Gerald Hopkins House (M. Burke Sullivan House, Hickory Ridge)	13183 Highland Road, Highland
HO-436,  Dr. Isaac J. Martin House (Kroh House)	3802 Church Road, Ellicott City
HO-437,  Bright House, Lawyer's Row (Reuben Johnson House)	8343 Court Avenue, Ellicott City
HO-438, Brother's Partnership (Peter Harmon House)	5740 Waterloo Road (MD 108), Columbia
HO-439,  Curtis-Shipley House	5771 Waterloo Road (MD 108), Ellicott City
HO-440,  Bellow's Spring Meth.Church (Mt. Pisgah A.M.E. Church), 8651 Old Annapolis Road (MD 108), Columbia
HO-441,  Pfeiffers Corner Schoolhouse,	6109 Rockburn Branch Park Road Rockburn Branch Regional Park, Elkridge
HO-442,  Old Guilford School Building,	6899 Oakland Mills Road, Columbia
HO-443,  Roheleder House, site (Mac Sherry Place), 6219 Lawyers Hill Road, Elkridge
HO-444,  Lift-the-Latch, 6176 Lawyers Hill Road, Elkridge
HO-445,  Murray-Miller House (Bonnie Wood), 6117 Lawyers Hill Road, Elkridge
HO-446,  Dobbin-Warner House & Gate House, 6162 Lawyers Hill Road, Elkridge
HO-447,  Maycroft (Atwell House), 6060 Old Lawyers Hill Road, Elkridge
HO-448,  Red Hill House (Hemphill House), 6053 Old Lawyers Hill Road, Elkridge
HO-449,  Old Grace Church Rectory, site, 5970 Baltimore Washington Boulevard (US 1), Elkridge
HO-450,  The Goldbeater's Cottage (Guercio House)	6159 Rockburn Hill Road, Elkridge
HO-451,  Hoogewerff-Donaldson Cottage (Elibank, Worthington House), 6460 Elibank Drive, Elkridge
HO-452,  Tutbury (Forbes House), 6440 Elibank Drive, Elkridge
HO-453,  Trinity School (Donaldson School)	Ilchester Road, Elkridge
HO-454,  The Knoll (Richard Olney Norris Tenant House)	6802 Norris Lane, Elkridge
HO-455,  Idle-A-While (Judge Stewart's House), 4688 Beechwood Road, Ellicott City
HO-456,  Fislage-Cavey House (Z.I. Dyke House), 4472 Ilchester Road, Ellicott City
HO-457,  Elkridge Hunt Club, 6101 Hunt Club Road, Elkridge
HO-458,  Ilchester Post Office (Schaad House), 4607 Bonnie Branch Road, Elkridge
HO-459,  Patapsco State Park Ranger's Quarters (Brown House), River Road, Elkridge
HO-460,  Linthicum House, site	Jennings Chapel Road, Glenwood
HO-461,  Hobbs Residence, 5773 Main Street, Elkridge
HO-462,  James Rettger House, 6520 Burgundy Lane, Clarksville
HO-463,  Ellicott City-Montgomery Co.Courthouse Road Milestones 4 & 5	Clarksville Pike (MD 108), Ellicott City
HO-464,  Linthicum House (Anderson House)	10690 Clarksville Pike (MD 108), Ellicott City
HO-465,  John T. Swann House (Watkins House), 13015 Clarksville Pike (MD 108), Columbia
HO-466,  Johnson Shingled House and Outbuildings	12810 Clarksville Pike (MD 108), Clarksville
HO-467,  Cooney-Smith Farm site (George Richardson Farmhouse, MacBeth Farm), 12799 Clarksville Pike (MD 108), Clarksville
HO-468,  Lambing Meadow Bank Barn & Farm (Sarah Richardson Farm), 12702 Clarksville Pike (MD 108), Clarksville
HO-469,  Keilholtz House, 12670 Clarksville Pike (MD 108), Clarksville
HO-470,  Zepp-Johnston Farm and Outbuildings, site	Clarksville Pike (MD 108), Clarksville
HO-471,  White Oak Farm, 12180 Clarksville Pike (MD 108), Clarksville
HO-472,  Langenfelder Farm and Outbuildings, site	Meadow Vista Way, Clarksville
HO-473,  Manakee Farm Tenant House	Clarksville Pike (MD 108) & Trotter Road, Clarksville
HO-474,  Hobbs Farm, 12058 Clarksville Pike (MD 108), Clarksville
HO-475,  Jericho Farm, site, 11349 Clarksville Pike (MD 108), Columbia
HO-476,  Edgewood Farm, site, Gaither Farm Road, Columbia
HO-477,  Thompson Farm Outbuildings, 10820 Clarksville Pike (MD 108), Columbia
HO-478,  Arthur Pickett House, site, Clarksville Pike (MD 108), Clarksville
HO-479,  Persimmon Bottom Farm	6010 Ten Oaks Road, Clarksville
HO-480,  Cricket Creek Farm (Stonebrook Farm),	6300 Guilford Road, Clarksville
HO-481,  The Bayard Easter House, site	Clarksville Pike (MD 108), Clarksville
HO-482,  Catherine Kuhn House, 8572 Main Street (MD 144), Ellicott City
HO-483,  S.E. Yates House, 8516 Main Street (MD 144), Ellicott City	
HO-484,  Lisbon Fire House Building, 16009 Frederick Road (MD 144), Lisbon
HO-485,  The Martin Slagle House, 15920 Frederick Road (MD 144), Lisbon
HO-486,  The I.O.O.F. Building (Odd Fellows' Hall, Rainbow Lodge No. 76, Church of the Open Bible, store)	16012 Frederick Road (MD 144), Lisbon
HO-487,  Manning Frame House, 16016 Frederick Road (MD 144), Lisbon
HO-488,  Engle House (Compton House), 16015 Frederick Road (MD 144), Lisbon	
HO-489,  Owings House (Frey House), 15949 Frederick Road (MD 144), Lisbon
HO-490,  Lisbon Post Office, 15936 Frederick Road (MD 144), Lisbon
HO-491,  Whittington House, 15912 Frederick Road (MD 144), Lisbon
HO-492,  Harris House, 15904 Frederick Road (MD 144), Lisbon	
HO-493,  Sydney C. Robertson House, 3744 St. Paul Street, Ellicott City
HO-494,  Waterford Farms, 4005 Jennings Chapel Road, Woodbine
HO-495,  Lisbon Historic District, Lisbon
HO-496,  Lineberg House, 5757 Main Street, Elkridge
HO-497,  Railroad Building, 5600 Main Street, Elkridge
HO-498,  Rowles-McCauley-Petrlik House and Store (McCauley House), 5782 Main Street, Elkridge
HO-499,  Elkridge Pharmacy, Inc., 5806 Main Street, Elkridge
HO-500,  Williams House (Daniels' House), 5828 Main Street, Elkridge
HO-501,  Elkridge Springs, 5834 Main Street, Elkridge
HO-502,  Rowles-Earp-Hand House, site (J.B. Kilby House), 5842 Main Street, Elkridge
HO-503,  Dixon Brick House, 5735 Race Road, Elkridge
HO-504,  Mewshaw House, 5846 Main Street, Elkridge
HO-505,  Dr. Hopkins House	5858 Main Street, Elkridge
HO-506,  Haker House, site	Brightwood Court, Ellicott City
HO-507,  Collins-Earp House (FCC Monitoring Station), 9200 Farmhouse Road, Columbia
HO-508,  Elkridge Country Club Building, 5746 Main Street, Elkridge
HO-509,  Mrs. Mills Double House	Railroad Avenue, Elkridge
HO-510,  B&O Railroad Company House	Railroad Avenue, Elkridge
HO-511,  William Bian's Two Frame Houses (Gray House & Lineberger House),5683 & 5691 Railroad Avenue, Elkridge
HO-512,  O'er the Spring (Harrison House)	5671 Railroad Avenue, Elkridge
HO-513,  Stumpner Shingled House, 5631 Railroad Avenue, Elkridge
HO-514,  Railroad Avenue Historic District	Railroad Avenue, Elkridge
HO-515,  Shipley House	5794 Paradise Avenue, Elkridge
HO-516,  Mrs. Fairbanks House	5776 Paradise Avenue, Elkridge
HO-517,  John Caples House	5793 Railroad Avenue, Elkridge
HO-518,  The Shinnamon Three Double Frame Houses, 1940 Furnace Avenue, Elkridge
HO-519,  Old Christ Church Rectory (Rev. Alexander Berger House), 7110 Oakland Mills Road, Columbia
HO-520,  Collins House, 7211 Oakland Mills Road, Columbia
HO-521,  Guilford Log Cabin, site	7451 Oakland Mills Road, Columbia
HO-522, Savage Mill General Store (Savage Mill Company Store), 8520 Commercial Street, Savage
HO-523,  Inglehart House	Broken Land Parkway, Columbia
HO-524,  Guilford General Store & Post Office Building	9463 Guilford Road, Columbia
HO-525, Simpsonville Stone Ruins, Cedar Lane, Columbia
HO-526,  Jacob Wells House, ruin	Sandstone Court, Ellicott City
HO-527,  Miller Farmhouse,	5748 Montgomery Road (MD 103), Elkridge
HO-528,  Zeltman House, 7901 Old Montgomery Road, Ellicott City
HO-529,  Arnold Farmhouse, 6245 Meadowridge Road, Elkridge
HO-530,  Rowles House, 7060 Baltimore Washington Boulevard (US 1), Elkridge
HO-531,  Kraft Farm, site (Rising Sun Riding Stables)	Glenmar Drive & Rising Sun Lane, Ellicott City
HO-532,  John Holland House, 9580 Baltimore Washington Boulevard (US 1), Laurel
HO-533, Salopha, 691 River Road, Sykesville
HO-534,  Union Dam (Union Dam and Mill Race; Union Manufacturing Company Sites), National Pike (US 40), Ellicott City
HO-535,  Rudisill House, Daniels Road, Ellicott City
HO-536,  Timberlea, 4468 Old Columbia Pike, Ellicott City
HO-537,  John R. Clarke Farmhouse, Twin Knolls Road, Columbia
HO-538,  Marks-Lough House (Profits End, 4881 Montgomery Road (MD 103), Ellicott City
HO-539,  Burlap Manor (Morning Choice #2)	6760 Norris Lane, Elkridge
HO-540,  Olney Tenant House, 6851 Norris Lane, Elkridge
HO-541,  Banavie, 6810 Norris Lane, Elkridge
HO-542,  Brown Residence, 6275 Rockburn Hill Road, Elkridge
HO-543,  Hipsley Mill Miller's House, site (Blumenauer House)	3690 Hipsley Mill Road, Woodbine
HO-544,  Ridgeley-Bowman Farm, 3896 Hipsley Mill Road, Woodbine
HO-545,  John Layman Farmhouse (Martha Lemmon House), 3955 Hipsley Mill Road, Woodbine
HO-546,  Denton Driver Farm (Mathias Farm), 3770 Woodbine Road (MD 94), Woodbine
HO-547,  Warfield Farmhouse (Vierling-Hutchinson House), 3248 Jones Road, Woodbine
HO-548,  Humphries Tenant House (Ostola Residence)	6155 Rockburn Hill Road, Elkridge
HO-549,  George H. Otten Farmhouse (University of Maryland Animal Husbandry Farm), 5885 Waterloo Road (MD 108), Ellicott City
HO-550,  Vansant-Henderson House (Latimer House ), 3782 Old Columbia Pike, Ellicott City
HO-551, Oakland Manor Washhouse and Icehouse (The Eye of the Camel, Rose Price Cottage)	5432 Vantage Point Road, Columbia
HO-552,  The Homestead	2260 Daisy Road, Woodbine
HO-553,  Joshua Disney Log House, 13475 Clarksville Pike (MD 108), Highland
HO-554,  Cotillion Building near Enniscorthy, 3408 Folly Quarter Road, Ellicott City
HO-555,  William Fralic House, 3917 Old Columbia Pike (MD 987), Ellicott City
HO-556, Keewaydin Farm, 4090 Old Columbia Pike (MD 987), Ellicott City
HO-557,  Mount Misery, 8469 Hill Street, Ellicott City
HO-558,  Prestage's Folly, 3832 Old Columbia Pike (MD 987), Ellicott City
HO-559,  William Bryan House, 3997 Old Columbia Pike (MD 987), Ellicott City
HO-560,  Hoffman Farm, 12393 Frederick Road (MD 144), West Friendship
HO-561,  Bessie Hall (Ryerson House), 6095 Cedarwood Drive, Columbia
HO-562,  Roby House, 13240 Greenberry Lane, Clarksville
HO-563,  Williams House, 13110 Greenberry Lane, Clarksville
HO-564,  Williams Tenant House	13105 Greenberry Lane, Clarksville
HO-565,  Pattison Whipps Log House, site, 7424 Oakland Mills Road, Columbia
HO-566,  Pfefferkorn House & Granary, 2797 Pfefferkorn Road, West Friendship
HO-567,  Joshua B. Day House, 14251 Triadelphia Road, Glenelg
HO-568,  Francis Shipley House, 8740 Baltimore Street, Savage
HO-569,  Waterloo Barracks, MD State Police, 7751 Baltimore Washington Boulevard (US 1), Jessup
HO-570,  Linnwood (Samuel F. Cobb House), 2327 Daniels Road, Ellicott City
HO-571,  Marlow House, 12975 Hall Shop Road, Highland
HO-572, Howard County Times Building	Ellicott City ?
HO-573,  The Judge's Bench (Buzz Suter Building), 8385 Main Street (MD 144), Ellicott City
HO-574,  Brown-Ellicott House
HO-575,  Highland School House, site, Hall Shop Road, Highland
HO-576,  Wilde Lake Barn (Oakland Manor Barn)	Hyla Brook Road, Columbia
HO-577,  Hill, Robbins, Carter's 5 shops on Main Street, 8048-8056 Main Street (MD 144), Ellicott City
HO-578,  19th Century Black Cemetery
HO-579,  Whipps Family & Public Cemetery, St. John's Lane, Ellicott City
HO-580,  (No Title) 8490 Main Street (MD 144), Ellicott City	
HO-581,  "The Pines" (Fort-Heine House) (Bernard or Barnard Fort House), 3713 Fels Lane, Ellicott City
HO-582,  Thomas Farm Tenant House, 2340 Daniels Road, Ellicott City
HO-583,  Samuel Burgess Carriage House	8450 Main Street (MD 144), Ellicott City
HO-584, Paternal Gift Farm 13555 Clarksville Pike (MD 108), Highland
HO-585,  Ellicott City Colored School (Colored School House), 8683 Frederick Road (MD 144), Ellicott City
HO-586,  Katydid, 8109-8111 Main Street (MD 144), Ellicott City
HO-587,  Maple Cliffe, 4012 College Avenue (4102 Hogg Court), Ellicott City
HO-588,  Lyons House, site	Ambra Court, Ellicott City
HO-589,  Pool's Evergreen Lounge & Cabins, site, Baltimore Washington Boulevard (US 1), Elkridge
HO-590, Rock Hill College (Rock Hill Academy)	3700 College Avenue, Ellicott City
HO-591, National Pike Milestone No. 10, Main Street (MD 144), Ellicott City
HO-592,  National Pike Milestone No. 11	Frederick Road (MD 144), Ellicott City
HO-593,  National Pike Milestone No. 12	Frederick Road (MD 144), Ellicott City
HO-594,  National Pike Milestone No. 13	Frederick Road (MD 144), Ellicott City	
HO-595,  National Pike Milestone No. 14	National Pike (US 40), Ellicott City	
HO-596,  National Pike Milestone No. 15	Frederick Road (MD 144), Ellicott City	
HO-597,  National Pike Milestone No. 16	Frederick Road (MD 144), Ellicott City	
HO-598,  National Pike Milestone No. 17	Frederick Road (MD 144), Ellicott City	
HO-599,  National Pike Milestone No. 18	Frederick Road (MD 144), Ellicott City	
HO-600,  National Pike Milestone No. 20	Frederick Road (MD 144), West Friendship	
HO-601,  National Pike Milestone No. 21	Frederick Road (MD 144), West Friendship	
HO-602,  National Pike Milestone No. 22	Frederick Road (MD 144), Cooksville	
HO-603,  National Pike Milestone No. 23	Frederick Road (MD 144), Cooksville	
HO-604,  National Pike Milestone No. 24	Frederick Road (MD 144), Woodbine	
HO-605,  National Pike Milestone No. 25	Frederick Road (MD 144), Woodbine	
HO-606,  National Pike Milestone No. 26	Frederick Road (MD 144), Woodbine	
HO-607,  National Pike Milestone No. 27	Frederick Road (MD 144), Mount Airy	
HO-608,  National Pike Milestone No. 28	Frederick Road (MD 144), Mount Airy
HO-609,  Church Road and Sylvan Lane Survey District	Church Road & Sylvan Lane, Ellicott City
HO-610, Lawyers Hill Historic District, Elkridge
HO-611,  Kendig House	2622 N. Rogers Avenue, Ellicott City
HO-612,  Eklof House & Store (Brun House)	2628 N. Rogers Avenue, Ellicott City
HO-613,  Jacques House	2796 Rogers Avenue (MD 99), Ellicott City
HO-614,  Hoolachan House, 2750 N. Ridge Road, Ellicott City
HO-615,  Rogers House, 2874 Rogers Avenue (MD 99), Ellicott City
HO-616,  Feaga House, 2835 Rogers Avenue (MD 99), Ellicott City
HO-617,  Radcliffe House, 3052 Rogers Avenue (MD 99), Ellicott City
HO-618,  Moxley House, 2965 Rogers Avenue (MD 99), Ellicott City
HO-619,  Jonestown Road Bridge, Rogers Avenue (MD 99), Ellicott City
HO-620,  Warfield/Flanerty Property, 2635 Daisy Road, Daisy
HO-621,  Flurrie House, 4065 Old Columbia Pike (MD 987), Ellicott City
HO-622,  Massey House, 4001 Old Columbia Pike (MD 987), Ellicott City
HO-623,  Nelson House,	3911 Nelson House Road (3992 Old Columbia Pike), Ellicott City
HO-624,  Casciaro House, 4120 Sears House Court (3979 Old Columbia Pike), Ellicott City
HO-625,  Lutz House, 3978 Old Columbia Pike (MD 987), Ellicott City
HO-626,  Farmer/Kittner House	3966 Old Columbia Pike (MD 987), Ellicott City
HO-627,  Shearn House, 3916 Old Columbia Pike (MD 987), Ellicott City
HO-628,  Fulton House, 3926 Old Columbia Pike (MD 987), Ellicott City
HO-629,  Merson House, 3922 Old Columbia Pike (MD 987), Ellicott City
HO-630,  Bohning House, 3962 Old Columbia Pike (MD 987), Ellicott City
HO-631,  Hollifield House, 8262 Old Frederick Road, Ellicott City
HO-632,  Pfeiffer House, 3887 Old Columbia Pike (MD 987), Ellicott City
HO-633,  Reed House, 3873 Old Columbia Pike (MD 987), Ellicott City
HO-634,  McLaughlin-Delisa House, 3909 Hunter Road, Ellicott City
HO-635,  Harrison House, 3872 Old Columbia Pike (MD 987), Ellicott City
HO-636,  Robinson Farm, site (Goldstein-Johnson Property), 6692 Cedar Lane, Simpsonville
HO-637,  Confederate Monument, Circuit Court Building, Ellicott City
HO-638,  Buckley Farm House, site, Old Montgomery Road, Columbia
HO-639,  Howard's Family Homeplace for Free Slaves	Meadowridge Road (MD 103), Elkridge
HO-640,  Jacob Zeltman Farm (Zeltman Horse Stables), Marshalee Lane, Elkridge
HO-641,  Bridge (SHA 13038), Roxbury Mills Road (MD 97) over Patuxent River, Brookeville
HO-642,  Shipley House, site (in Alpha Ridge Park)	11685 Old Frederick Road (MD 99), Marriottsville
HO-643,  Warfield-Sullivan House, 3625 Andrea Drive, West Friendship
HO-644,  Ridgely Tenant House, site, 3615 Ivory Road, Glenelg
HO-645,  Milton Shipley House, 2920 Sykesville Road (MD 32), West Friendship
HO-646,  Mary Selby Burgess House (Burgess-Sullivan House)	3075 Sykesville Road (MD 32), West Friendship
HO-647,  Edward Talbott Clark Farm Buildings Complex, site	4296 Montgomery Road (MD 103), Ellicott City
HO-648,  Perrin's Tenant House, site, Marshalee Drive, Elkridge
HO-649,  Bridge (SHA 13032), National Pike (US 40) over Little Patuxent River, Ellicott City
HO-650,  Bridge 13041, Dorsey Road (MD 176) over Deep Run, Elkridge
HO-651,  SHA Bridge No. HO-29 (Bridge No. HO 29),	Triadelphia Mill Road over Patuxent River, Dayton	
HO-652,  Bridge (SHA HO-0061),	Athol Avenue over Deep Run, Elkridge	
HO-653,  Bridge (SHA HO-0101),	Frederick Road over Hudson Branch, Ellicott City	
HO-654,  Bridge (SHA HO-0102),	Woodland Road over tributary of Little Patuxent River, Ellicott City	
HO-655,  Bridge (SHA HO-0110,)	Henryton Road over tributary of Patapsco River, Marriottsville	
HO-656,  Bridge (SHA 130034),	National Pike (US 40) over Forest Road, Ellicott City	
HO-657,  Bridge (SHA HO-6),	River Road over Rockburn Branch, Elkridge	
HO-658,  Bridge (SHA HO-13),	Stephens Road over Hammond Branch, Laurel	
HO-659,  Bridge (SHA HO-15),	Murray Hill Road over Middle Patuxent River, Laurel	
HO-660,  Bridge (SHA HO-31),	Pfefferkorn Road over Middle Patuxent River, West Friendship	
HO-661,  Bridge (SHA HO-32),	Shady Lane over Dorsey Branch, Glenwood	
HO-662,  Bridge (SHA HO-35),	Hipsley Mill Road over Cabin Branch, Woodbine	
HO-663,  Bridge (SHA HO-38),	Daisy Road over Little Cattail Creek, Woodbine	
HO-664,  Bridge (SHA HO-41),	Daisy Road over Cattail Creek, Woodbine	
HO-665,  Bridge (SHA HO-48),	Bethany Lane over Little Patuxent River, Ellicott City	
HO-666,  Bridge (SHA HO-55),	Old Montgomery Road over Little Patuxant, Columbia	
HO-667,  Bridge (SHA HO-62),	Mayfield Avenue over Deep Run, Elkridge	
HO-668,  Bridge (SHA HO-106),	Pindell School Road over Hammond Branch, Fulton	
HO-669,  Bridge (SHA HO-107),	Tiber Alley over Tiber River, Ellicott City	
HO-670,  Bridge (SHA HO-108),	Sanner Road over branch of Middle Patuxent River, Clarksville	
HO-671,  Bridge (SHA 13029),	Guilford Road (MD 732) over B&O Railroad/MD 732 over CSX, Annapolis Junction	
HO-672,  SHA Small Structure 13055X0, 	Frederick Road (MD 144) over Branch of Cattail Creek, Lisbon	
HO-673,  Bridge (SHA 13046),  Sykesville Road (MD 32) over Patapsco River, River Road & Railroad, Sykesville
HO-674, Methodist Church	 	
HO-675, John Hines Farmstead	 	
HO-676, John D. Harp Barn (Windridge Farm Barn), 14564 Dorsey Mill Road, Glenwood
HO-677, Bridge (SHA HO-2),	Bonnie Branch Road over Bonnie Branch, Ellicott City
HO-678, Bridge (SHA HO-53)	Henryton Road over tributary of Patapsco River, Marriottsville
HO-679, Bridge (SHA HO-105)Henryton Road over tributary of Patapsco River, Marriottsville
HO-680, Bridge No. HO-132 (Old Columbia Pike over Tiber River)	Old Columbia Pike over Tiber River, Ellicott City
HO-681, Bridge (SHA 13037)	Roxbury Mills Road (MD 97) over Cattail Creek, Glenwood
HO-682, 8489 Heatherwold Drive, Laurel
HO-683, 10905 Johns Hopkins Road, Laurel	
HO-684, 10935 Johns Hopkins Road, Laurel	
HO-685, 10945 Johns Hopkins Road, Laurel
HO-686, 11139 Johns Hopkins Road, site	11139 Johns Hopkins Road, Laurel	
HO-687, 8321 Leishear Road, site	8321 Leishear Road, Laurel	
HO-688, 8449 Leishear Road, Laurel	
HO-689, 8466 Leishear Road, Laurel
HO-690, 8474 Leishear Road, Laurel	
HO-691, 8477 Leishear Road, Laurel	
HO-692, 8482 Leishear Road, Laurel
HO-693, Melvin and Myrtle Scaggs House, 8430 Old Columbia Road (originally inventoried as 8430 Murphy Road), Laurel
HO-694, 8555 Murphy Road, Laurel	
HO-695, Old Columbia Road Bridge (SHA HO-64), Old Columbia Road over Middle Patuxent River, Columbia	
HO-696, 8371 Old Columbia Road, Laurel	
HO-697, 8377 Old Columbia Road, Laurel	
HO-698, 8431 Old Columbia Road, Laurel	
HO-699, 8450 Old Columbia Road, Laurel
HO-700, Country Corner, 10570 Scaggsville Road, Laurel	
HO-701, 10571 Scaggsville Road, Laurel	
HO-702, 10578 Scaggsville Road, Laurel	
HO-703, Welsh's School (Highridge School), 10623 Scaggsville Road, Laurel	
HO-704, 10643 Scaggsville Road, Laurel	
HO-705, 10671 Scaggsville Road, Laurel	
HO-706, 10710 Scaggsville Road, Laurel	
HO-707,(site), 10732 Scaggsville Road, Laurel	
HO-708, Emmanuel Methodist Church, 10755 Scaggsville Road, Laurel	
HO-709, 10756 Scaggsville Road, Laurel	
HO-710, Arthue E. Scaggs House	10763 Scaggsville Road, Laurel	
HO-711, 10787 Scaggsville Road, Laurel	
HO-712, John L. Hines House, 10909 Scaggsville Road, Laurel	
HO-713, 10919A Scaggsville Road, Laurel	
HO-714, 10919B Scaggsville Road, Laurel	
HO-715, 10961 Scaggsville Road, Laurel	
HO-716, 10964 Scaggsville Road, Laurel	
HO-717, 11125 Scaggsville Road, site, 11125 Scaggsville Road, Laurel	
HO-718, 11268 Scaggsville Road, Laurel	
HO-719, 11295 Scaggsville Road, site, 11295 Scaggsville Road, Laurel	
HO-720, Whetzel Farm, site, 11425 Scaggsville Road, Fulton	
HO-721, Wessel Farm, site, 11460 Scaggsville Road, Fulton
HO-722, 10560 Shaker Drive, Columbia	
HO-723, 10600 Shaker Drive, site, 10600 Shaker Drive, Columbia	
HO-724, William Blackstone Log House, site	3597 Centennial Lane, Ellicott City	
HO-725, Bridge (SHA HO-8)	Sheppard Lane over Middle Patuxent River, Ellicott City	
HO-726, Bridge (SHA HO-20)	Folly Quarter Road over Middle Patuxent River, Ellicott City	
HO-727, Bridge (SHA HO-49)	Frederick Road over Little Patuxent River, Ellicott City	
HO-728, Bridge (SHA 13003)	Baltimore Washington Boulevard (US 1) over Deep Run, Elkridge	
HO-729, Bridge (SHA 13007)	Baltimore Washington Boulevard (US 1 SB) over Little Patuxent River, Savage	
HO-730, Bridge (SHA 13026) Pedestrian bridge over Middle Patuxent River	Pedestrian bridge over Middle Patuxent River, Simpsonville	
HO-731, Bridge (SHA HO-30)	Roxbury Road & Dorsey Mill Road over Dorsey Branch, Glenwood
HO-733, Patapsco Quarry Company Sites,	Mulligans Hill Lane, Ellicott City	
HO-734, Gray's Station Water Sites,	Ellicott City	
HO-735, Thomas House, Ellicott City	
HO-736, Williams Run Water Station Sites, Ellicott City	
HO-737, Ilchester Mill/Dismal Mill Sites, Ellicott City	
HO-738, Bonnie Branch Mill Site, Bonnie Branch Road & River Rd. (SW corner), Ellicott City	
HO-739, Davis Mills, Bonnie Branch Road, Ellicott City	
HO-740, Hockley Forge and Mill Sites, Levering Avenue, Elkridge	
HO-741, Bridge (SHA HO-111), Sylvan Lane over tributary of Sucker Branch, Ellicott City	
HO-742, Guilford Industrial Historic District, Located off of Old Guilford Road, directly east of Route 32, Columbia	
HO-742-1, Spano Family House, 9201 Old Guilford Road, Columbia	
HO-743, Foundations off of Annapolis Rock Road	off of Annapolis Rock Road, Woodbine	
HO-744, Anderson Farm, 2107 Long Corner Road, Mount Airy	
HO-745, Abandoned Farm Complex	Long Corner Road, Mount Airy	
HO-746, Hilton Farm, 3780 Woodbine Road (MD 94), Woodbine	
HO-747, Maycroft Tenant House & Detached Kitchen, 6064 Old Lawyers Hill Road, Elkridge	
HO-748, 6170 Lawyers Hill Road, Elkridge	
HO-749, 6195 Lawyers Hill Road, Elkridge	
HO-750, Small Structure 13084XO, Woodbine Road (MD 94) over Lisbons Little Creek, Woodbine
HO-751, Howard Cotton Factory (Apple Butter Factory, Sykes Mill, B.F. Shriver Cannery) 350 Sykesville Road (MD 32), Sykesville	
HO-752, Ellicott City Post Office	8267 Main Street (MD 144), Ellicott City	
HO-753, Small Structure 13166XO	MD 983 over Tributary of Patuxent River, Laurel	
HO-754, William Meade Farm	12955 Frederick Road (MD 144), West Friendship	
HO-755, Sykesville Creamery, site	Forsythe Road & West Friendship Road (MD 851), Sykesville	
HO-756, St. Luke's Church,	350 River Road, Sykesville	
HO-757, Small Structure 13063XO, Frederick Road (MD 144) over Tributary of Cattail Creek, Woodbine	
HO-758, Bridge 13155, South Entrance Road over Little Patuxent River, Columbia	
HO-759, Patapsco State Park, Halethorpe/Catons/Ell City/Gwynn Oak	
HO-759-1, Randall-Reese-Umbach Lime Kiln	880 Marriottsville Road, Marriottsville	
HO-760, Patuxent River State Park	
HO-760, Patuxent River State Park	 	
HO-761, House	5004 Ilchester Road, Ellicott City	
HO-762, House	5761 Elkridge Heights Road, Elkridge	
HO-763, House 	3600 Fels Lane, Ellicott City	
HO-764, Open Number	 	
HO-765, House	Frederick Road (MD 144) & Sykesville Road (MD 32), SW corner, West Friendship	
HO-766, African-American Episcopal Church	Merryman Street (south side) before intersection with Hill Street, Ellicott City	
HO-767, Enchanted Forest (Enchanted Forest Theme Park), 10040 Baltimore National Pike (US 40), Ellicott City	
HO-768, House	MD 144 south side, just west of Centennial Lane, 	
HO-769, House	8957 Frederick Road (MD 144), Ellicott City	
HO-770, Killarney (Good Fellowship, Cavey Farm)	10375 Cavey Lane, Woodstock	
HO-771, 13800 Russell Zepp Drive, Clarksville	
HO-772, 8064 Baltimore Washington Boulevard, site	8064 Baltimore Washington Boulevard (US 1), Jessup	
HO-773, 8070 Baltimore Washington Boulevard (US 1), Jessup	
HO-774, 8104 Baltimore Washington Boulevard (US 1), Jessup	
HO-775, Bridge 13022	MD 32 over Middle Patuxent River, West Friendship	
HO-776, Bridge 13024	MD 32 over Middle Patuxent River, Clarksville	
HO-777, Bridge 13025	MD 32 over Middle Patuxent River, Clarksville	
HO-778, Small Structure X13001	Frederick Road (MD 144) over Haymeadow Branch, Mount Airy	
HO-779, Small Structure 13064XO, Frederick Road (MD 144) over small branch of Middle Patuxent River, Woodbine
HO-780, Small Structure 13081XO over Tributary of Cattail Creek, Woodbine	
HO-781, Ellicott Mills Middle School, site	4445 Montgomery Road (MD 103), Ellicott City	
HO-782, Gorman Road Survey District, Laurel	
HO-783, Loudon Avenue Culvert	Loudon Avenue over unnamed tributary of Shallow Run, Hanover	
HO-784, Elkridge Landing Historic District	Main St, Railroad Ave, Paradise Ave, Furnace Ave, Elkridge	
HO-785, Levering Avenue Survey District	5471-5590 Levering Avenue, Elkridge	
HO-786, Anderson Post Office & Dwelling, Cugle House	6480 Anderson Avenue, Hanover	
HO-787, Samuel Norris House	6611 Railroad Street, Hanover	
HO-788, First Discovery, Winters House	6270 Winters Lane, Hanover	
HO-789, Reilly-McNamara House, site 6322 Winters Lane, Hanover	
HO-790, Hugg-Thomas Wildlife Management Area	Sykesville	
HO-791, Taylor House	6150 Hanover Road, Hanover	
HO-792, House	6470 Anderson Avenue, Hanover	
HO-793, Anderson Brick House, 6449 Anderson Avenue, Hanover	
HO-794, Matthews House	6280 Mound Street, Hanover	
HO-795, Bender/Binder Farm	6771 Dorsey Road (MD 176), Elkridge	
HO-796, Bond-Webb House, site (Thomas D. Bond House)	9410 All Saints Road, Laurel	
HO-797, Tutbury Gardeners Cottage, 6450 Elibank Drive, Elkridge	
HO-798, Claremont, 5840 Claremont Drive (formerly 6051 Lawyers Hill Road ), Elkridge	
HO-799, House, 525 Baltimore Avenue, Laurel	
HO-800, Mount Moriah Lodge No. 7, Guilford Road, Annapolis Junction/Jessup	
HO-801, Joseph Travers House, 9309 Whiskey Bottom Road, Laurel	
HO-802, Stone Boundary Wall Fragment behind 4635 Ilchester Road, Ellicott City	
HO-803, Old Washington Road Survey District, Old Washington, Augustine, Montgomery, Downs Roads, Elkridge	
HO-804, George Hobbs House & Store, 6179 Old Washington Road, Elkridge	
HO-805, Hobbs House, 6181 Old Washington Road, Elkridge	
HO-806, Old Elkridge Schoolhouse, 6317 Old Washington Road, Elkridge	
HO-807, Hartke Double House, 6301 & 6305 Old Washington Road, Elkridge	
HO-808, House	6415 Loudon Avenue, Elkridge	
HO-809, House	6615 Highland Avenue, Elkridge	
HO-810, Hopkins-Roberts-Hood House, site	6650 Highland Avenue, Elkridge	
HO-811, House	6443 Harthorne Avenue, Elkridge	
HO-812, House	6754 Athol Avenue, Elkridge	
HO-813, House	7011 Lennox Avenue, Elkridge	
HO-814, Walter and Gertrude Dixon House	7024 Cedar Avenue (Lennox Park), Elkridge	
HO-815, House	7032 Cedar Avenue, Elkridge	
HO-816, House	6901 Linden Avenue, Elkridge	
HO-817, House	6909 Linden Avenue, Elkridge	
HO-818, The (Albert W. and Helen M.) Cornick Property (Sams Inc.; Sam and Elsie's Restaurant)	9994 Washington Boulevard (US 1), Laurel	
HO-819, The (Harry and Fulton) Gordon Property (McMillan Marine; "Sappington's Sweep")	10140 Washington Boulevard (US 1), Laurel	
HO-820, Charles & Gertrude Russell House, site	9533 N. Laurel Road, Laurel	
HO-821, The Haller Property ("Rocway Towers"; Truckmax Auto Sales, Inc; "Woodcroft")	9921 Washington Boulevard (US 1), Laurel	
HO-822, The Picket Property (Allstate Insurance Office; White's Contrivance)	8826 Washington Boulevard (US 1), Jessup	
HO-823, The Cornelius W. Pickett Property (Garage) (J & D Auto Service; White's Contrivance)	8802 Washington Boulevard (US 1), Jessup	
HO-824, The Joseph & Irene Buncke Property (Eastern Stair and Woodwork)	8402 Washington Boulevard (US 1), Laurel	
HO-825, The Michael Bucheck Property, site (Cherry Hill Construction, Inc.)	8211 Washington Boulevard (US 1), Jessup

References

 
Slave cabins and quarters in the United States